A megagon or 1,000,000-gon is a polygon with one million sides (mega-, from the Greek μέγας, meaning "great", being a unit prefix denoting a factor of one million).

Regular megagon
A regular megagon is represented by the Schläfli symbol {1,000,000} and can be constructed as a truncated 500,000-gon, t{500,000}, a twice-truncated 250,000-gon, tt{250,000}, a thrice-truncated 125,000-gon, ttt{125,000}, or a four-fold-truncated 62,500-gon, tttt{62,500}, a five-fold-truncated 31,250-gon, }, or a six-fold-truncated 15,625-gon, }.

A regular megagon has an interior angle of 179°59'58.704"
3.14158637 rad. The area of a regular megagon with sides of length a is given by

The perimeter of a regular megagon inscribed in the unit circle is:

which is very close to 2π. In fact, for a circle the size of the Earth's equator, with a circumference of 40,075 kilometres, one edge of a megagon inscribed in such a circle would be slightly over 40 meters long. The difference between the perimeter of the inscribed megagon and the circumference of this circle comes to less than 1/16 millimeters.

Because 1,000,000 = 26 × 56, the number of sides is not a product of distinct Fermat primes and a power of two. Thus the regular megagon is not a constructible polygon. Indeed, it is not even constructible with the use of an angle trisector, as the number of sides is neither a product of distinct Pierpont primes, nor a product of powers of two and three.

Philosophical application
Like René Descartes's example of the chiliagon, the million-sided polygon has been used as an illustration of a well-defined concept that cannot be visualised.

The megagon is also used as an illustration of the convergence of regular polygons to a circle.

Symmetry
The regular megagon has Dih1,000,000 dihedral symmetry, order 2,000,000, represented by 1,000,000 lines of reflection. Dih1,000,000 has 48 dihedral subgroups: (Dih500,000, Dih250,000, Dih125,000, Dih62,500, Dih31,250, Dih15,625), (Dih200,000, Dih100,000, Dih50,000, Dih25,000, Dih12,500, Dih6,250, Dih3,125), (Dih40,000, Dih20,000, Dih10,000, Dih5,000, Dih2,500, Dih1,250, Dih625), (Dih8,000, Dih4,000, Dih2,000, Dih1,000, Dih500, Dih250, Dih125, Dih1,600, Dih800, Dih400, Dih200, Dih100, Dih50, Dih25), (Dih320, Dih160, Dih80, Dih40, Dih20, Dih10, Dih5), and (Dih64, Dih32, Dih16, Dih8, Dih4, Dih2, Dih1). It also has 49 more cyclic symmetries as subgroups: (Z1,000,000, Z500,000, Z250,000, Z125,000, Z62,500, Z31,250, Z15,625), (Z200,000, Z100,000, Z50,000, Z25,000, Z12,500, Z6,250, Z3,125), (Z40,000, Z20,000, Z10,000, Z5,000, Z2,500, Z1,250, Z625), (Z8,000, Z4,000, Z2,000, Z1,000, Z500, Z250, Z125), (Z1,600, Z800, Z400, Z200, Z100, Z50, Z25), (Z320, Z160, Z80, Z40, Z20, Z10, Z5), and (Z64, Z32, Z16, Z8, Z4, Z2, Z1), with Zn representing π/n radian rotational symmetry.

John Conway labeled these lower symmetries with a letter and order of the symmetry follows the letter. r2000000 represents full symmetry and a1 labels no symmetry. He gives d (diagonal) with mirror lines through vertices, p with mirror lines through edges (perpendicular), i with mirror lines through both vertices and edges, and g for rotational symmetry. 

These lower symmetries allows degrees of freedom in defining irregular megagons. Only the g1000000 subgroup has no degrees of freedom but can be seen as directed edges.

Megagram
A megagram is a million-sided star polygon. There are 199,999 regular forms given by Schläfli symbols of the form {1000000/n}, where n is an integer between 2 and 500,000 that is coprime to 1,000,000. There are also 300,000 regular star figures in the remaining cases.

See also
Chiliagon
Myriagon

Notes

References

Polygons by the number of sides